Malmö FF competed in Division 2 Sydsvenska Serien for the 1925–26 season.

Players

Squad stats

|}

Club

Other information

References
 

Malmö FF seasons
Malmo FF